Wings of Life (known as Pollen in France and  Hidden Beauty: A Love Story That Feeds the Earth in the United Kingdom) is a 2011 French-American nature documentary film directed by Louis Schwartzberg and released by Disneynature. It was released theatrically in France on  16 March 2011, with narration by Mélanie Laurent, and in home media markets across the US on 16 April 2013, with narration by Meryl Streep.

Synopsis
The film's synopsis states:

Production
Hidden Beauty was one of the original slate for Disneynature announced on 21 April 2008. At that time, the film was scheduled for a worldwide release in 2011.

Release
The film was released as Pollen in France on 16 March 2011. The film was released on Blu-ray and DVD by Walt Disney Studios Home Entertainment in North America as Wings of Life on 16 April 2013.

References

External links
 
 Pollen - Disneynature France website
 Hidden Beauty: A Love Story That Feeds the Earth Disneynature UK website
 

2011 films
French documentary films
Disneynature films
Documentary films about nature
American documentary films
American independent films
2011 documentary films
Pollination
2010s American films
2010s French films